James Jeremiah Murphy (born February 4, 1970) is an American musician, DJ, singer, songwriter, and record producer. His most well-known musical project is LCD Soundsystem, which first gained attention with its single "Losing My Edge" in 2002 before releasing its eponymous debut album in February 2005 to critical acclaim and top 20 success in the UK. LCD Soundsystem's second and third studio albums, Sound of Silver (2007) and This Is Happening (2010) respectively, were met with universal acclaim from several music review outlets. Both albums have also reached the top 50 in the Billboard 200.

LCD Soundsystem was named one of Rolling Stone'''s New Immortals—"currently active (or relatively recently defunct) artists who [they] think will stand the test of time." In 2011, it was announced that LCD Soundsystem would disband with a final show on April 2, 2011 at Madison Square Garden. In the following years, Murphy continued to pursue other artistic projects: some music-related, others not. In early 2016, the band announced a reunion as well as an appearance at the 2016 Coachella Festival, with their fourth album American Dream and respective tour following afterwards in 2017.
In May 2018 LCD Soundsystem were headliners at All Points East festival in Victoria Park, London.

Early projects and influences
Murphy was born and grew up in Princeton Junction, New Jersey and graduated from West Windsor-Plainsboro High School in 1988.

In discussing some of his influences and favorite music with Rolling Stone, Murphy namechecked the B-52's, the Fall, Yes, David Bowie and Can. He has also named Orchestral Manoeuvres in the Dark (OMD), Bronski Beat and the Smiths as childhood favorites. Murphy was a member of Falling Man from 1988 to 1989, Pony from 1992 to 1994, and Speedking from 1995 to 1997. He was also the sound engineer for Sub Pop band Six Finger Satellite. (Former Six Finger Satellite member John Maclean is now on Murphy's record label as The Juan MacLean.)

Murphy attended New York University, where he was an English major but later dropped out. At age 22, Murphy was offered a job writing for the sitcom Seinfeld which was then little-known. He did not expect the show to be successful and chose to continue with music instead.

 DFA Records 
In the late 1980s Murphy picked the name Death from Above after seeing a helicopter emblazoned with the slogan in the film Apocalypse Now. He has used this name for various projects over the years including as nickname for a signature PA set developed for Six Finger Satellite during the mid-90s. In 2000 Murphy engineered Northern Irish DJ David Holmes' album Bow Down to the Exit Sign and was introduced to the record's co-producer, Tim Goldsworthy (formerly of UNKLE).  Goldsworthy and Murphy would DJ together on the Lower East Side, doing so with diverse genres of music.  They went on to found DFA Records with Jonathan Galkin in 2001.  The name "Death from Above" led to a dispute with a two-man Canadian band also using the same name. In response to a legal threat, the Canadian group changed their name to Death from Above 1979.

LCD Soundsystem

 LCD Soundsystem 
In 2002, Murphy started the electronic dance-punk band LCD Soundsystem, releasing a string of singles through DFA Records. The most successful of these initial singles was "Losing My Edge", which peaked at number 117 in the UK. The band released its self-titled debut album in 2005 to critical acclaim.

 Sound of Silver 

Murphy's second LCD Soundsystem album, entitled Sound of Silver, was released on March 12, 2007. In its aftermath, he quipped to Mojo: "You don't have to work very hard to write an article about us. "Just use the words 'unlikely frontman', 'bear-like', 'unshaven', 'Talking Heads', blah blah blah..."

In October 2009 Pitchfork Media named the track "All My Friends" off Sound of Silver, the second best song of the decade, and a week later, Sound of Silver was ranked at #17 in The Top 200 Albums of the 2000s list. He also has a CD in the Fabriclive CD series, Fabric Live 36, made in collaboration with LCD Soundsystem drummer Pat Mahoney, released in October 2007. In late 2008 Murphy also announced he was to play bass guitar in Free Energy, a classic rock band, with LCD Soundsystem drummer Pat Mahoney and friends Scott Wells and Paul Sprangers, although this was later refuted by Murphy as a misinterpretation.

 This Is Happening and disbandment 

In late 2009 Murphy moved into film scoring, writing music for Noah Baumbach's film Greenberg. The soundtrack was released on March 22, 2010. LCD Soundsystem's third album This Is Happening was released on May 17, 2010 in the UK and May 18 in the US. The album was recorded over the course of 2009 and early 2010 in the Mansion. April saw the release of the first single "Drunk Girls" with an accompanying music video directed by Spike Jonze. The album is dedicated to Jerry Fuchs (1974–2009), who had performed drums live with the band on occasion as well as having a big part with other associated DFA acts.

Murphy announced his retirement from LCD Soundsystem with the release of This Is Happening, and made his last television appearance under that name on February 14, 2011, on The Colbert Report. His last concert at Madison Square Garden was simulcast streaming on Pitchfork Media's website on April 2, 2011.

In July 2012, Shut Up and Play the Hits, a documentary film about James Murphy and LCD Soundsystem's final concert, received a limited theatrical release in the US and subsequently in UK cinemas and on Blu-ray and DVD. The film follows James Murphy over a 48-hour period, from the day of the band's final gig at Madison Square Garden to the morning after the show. The film also features intermittent segments from an extended interview between Murphy and pop culture writer Chuck Klosterman.

Reunion and American Dream (2015–present)
In October 2015, over 5 years after the band's third and previously final album, Consequence of Sound reported that "multiple sources" confirmed LCD Soundsystem's reunion in 2016 by headlining multiple "high-profile music festivals in the US and UK". The report was also confirmed by Billboard the same day, but quickly after these rumours, DFA Records label manager Kris Petersen denied the reunion of the band, with DFA co-founder Jonathan Galkin seconding the denial in a Pitchfork article.

However, on December 24, 2015, the band contradicted these denials by releasing a new single, "Christmas Will Break Your Heart". After the new single, on January 4, 2016, LCD Soundsystem confirmed that they would be headlining the 2016 Coachella Festival. The day following on January 5, 2016, Murphy confirmed a new studio album in 2016 in addition to other unspecified appearances. Murphy credits David Bowie for helping convince him to reunite LCD Soundsystem.

On May 4, 2017, Murphy announced two new LCD Soundsystem singles entitled "Call the Police" and "American Dream" were to be released at midnight, coinciding with their performance on Saturday Night Live. He also said that the album was nearing completion. American Dream was released on September 1, 2017 through DFA Records and Columbia Records.

Other projects

After the disbandment of LCD Soundsystem (between 2011 and 2015), James Murphy pursued other artistic projects including remixing, directing, developing his own espresso, producing, and putting out footage and audio from LCD Soundsystem's final show. Murphy has stated that dissolving LCD Soundsystem has made it possible for him to experiment with other projects. "So [these projects] [become] possible, which is incredible. I get to do all this crazy shit – and if I ever wanted to be in a band again, I can probably figure that out." He has also stated how much time the creation of an album takes and that time can be spent doing other activities. "I wouldn't have a record coming out in April if I had done all [these projects]. It's impossible. And if I had a record coming out in April, I would have been fucking invisible for two years." Though Murphy has illustrated a great freedom with his spare time after the band, he also "miss[es] it a lot [at times]".

 Britney Spears 
In 2003, Murphy worked with pop singer Britney Spears on her album In the Zone, but the collaboration was unsuccessful. According to Murphy, "It was very strange – we were both lying on the floor, head-to head, working on lyrics in a notepad. She seemed eager to please, but it went nowhere. She went to dinner and just never came back." A track from their collaboration was leaked online in 2006.

 Reflektor 
Murphy worked on Arcade Fire's fourth studio album Reflektor. A Win Butler interview conducted by Rolling Stone revealed that he thought of LCD Soundsystem "like New Order and the B-52's". He continued to state that Arcade Fire are influenced by bands that have also influenced LCD Soundsystem. A collaboration between Arcade Fire and James Murphy has been intended since Arcade Fire's sophomore album Neon Bible, however time conflicts prevented such a collaboration. Though Murphy has regularly stated in interviews that he "didn't do that much" to help Arcade Fire, he has said that he worked the most extensively on the song "Awful Sound (Oh Eurydice)". Butler predicts that the band and James Murphy will collaborate again in the future, as he feels "like [they] have more work to do".

 Despacio 
Together with David and Stephen Dewaele of 2ManyDjs and engineer John Klett, Murphy designed Despacio: a formation of eight McIntosh speakers stacked to eleven feet. The idea for the system came from Murphy and the Dewaele brother's dissatisfaction with the evolution of DJ culture and how DJing has become more of a "show-spectacle-type scenario" and has departed from the days of people dancing in the dark with little attention to the DJ. The design is "designed for really immersive listening". The reason behind creating and performing with Despacio is to encourage DJs to implement a similar sound system, altering the course of DJ culture to its dance roots.

 Subway Symphony 
James Murphy has been attempting to change the sound of the New York turnstile beeps since 1999. Murphy has described the current turnstile sound as of 2014 as a "dissonant rubbing-Styrofoam-on-glass squeak" that is "horrible". Because the Metropolitan Transit Authority plans to update the system by 2019, Murphy has proposed his turnstile plan that would have each turnstile harmonize with others by emitting three-to-five note sequences. Installing new sound chips will be an easier task during the renovations. Murphy feels that the more pleasant sounds will also help people's attitudes toward taking the subway. He believes that people will "feel a nostalgia" for certain destinations when hearing its unique melody. Murphy is prepared for the responsibilities if the idea is green-lit by the MTA and would be "broken hearted [if it doesn't happen]".

In June 2015, he partnered with Heineken to launch the project, branded as the "Subway Symphony." However, the MTA has denied any possibility of the project happening, as the standard turnstile beep is a necessary ADA-compliant tool for the visually impaired.

 2014 US Open Remixes 
Collaborating with IBM, James Murphy "remixed" the 2014 US Open matches. Murphy composed an algorithm that generated pieces from the sounds and occurrences, such as fault, point and ace for example, of the actual matches. Murphy cut his favorite moments from the pieces and created 14 remixes from them. The remixes were created in real time during the matches on US Open's website. The pieces are titled by their match number and are viewable on the website with visual accompaniment denoting points scored. The website categorizes the pieces by men's' matches, women's' matches and Murphy's 14 remixes.

 David Bowie 
On November 5, 2013, Columbia Records released The Next Day Extra, a three-disc expanded edition of David Bowie's album The Next Day. On the expanded edition, Murphy remixed the track "Love Is Lost". The title of the remix is "Love is Lost (Hello Steve Reich Remix)". When Murphy was offered to remix the track, he had not remixed a song in five years, making it "really scary". He said "it would have been scary if it was a remix for somebody I had never even heard of, but it was super scary to do that [Laughs]".  David Bowie is a significant influence on Murphy's music.

Murphy was to be a producer for Bowie's final studio album, Blackstar, but it reportedly fell through. However, he does make a guest appearance on the album as a percussionist.

 "Little Duck" 
Murphy participated in Canon's Project Imaginat10n, which called for five celebrities to direct short films based on pictures uploaded by people around the world to the Project Imaginat10n site. The result was "Little Duck", Murphy's first directorial effort. Ron Howard advised Murphy in his directing.  Shooting took place in Japan, the setting of the film.  The film follows a young man who travels from Manhattan to Japan in order to help solve his brothers' problems.

 House of Good 
In collaboration with coffee company Blue Bottle, Murphy created his signature coffee called House of Good.  It is described as a "syrupy, well-balanced and thoroughly accessible" espresso.  It was developed with help of Blue Bottle founder James Freeman.

 Shut Up and Play the Hits and The Long Goodbye 
LCD Soundsystem played their last show until 2016 on April 2nd, 2011 at Madison Square Garden.  Both a documentary and a complete recording of the show were made. Shut Up and Play the Hits, directed by Will Lovelace and Dylan Southern, documents the highlights of the show and Murphy's actions after it.  11 cinematographers captured the entire near four-hour show from different angles in addition to three roof cameras. The concert footage is interwoven with scenes from Murphy's personal life, including an interview with writer Chuck Klosterman. The documentary screened at select theaters around America for a limited time in 2012 and was later released in a DVD and Blu-ray form by Oscilloscope on October 9, 2012.  The physical form consisted of three discs that contained the documentary and footage of the entire concert.The Long Goodbye is an audio capture of LCD Soundsystem's last show at Madison Square Garden.  James Murphy mixed the audio, which was different from its video counterpart "because the film is mixed for your eye and the record is mixed for your ears."  Murphy has stated that the work into mixing the audio had been strenuous and "just murder".  The Long Goodbye was released as a vinyl box set on record store day, April 19, 2014.  It was later released on vinyl and digitally.       Other projects 
He recorded a song with Gorillaz and OutKast's Andre 3000, called "DoYaThing", for their Converse collection. It was released on February 23, 2012. He produced a song with Pulp called "After You". It was released as a present on Christmas Day 2012 to fans. Murphy also appeared in The Comedy with Tim Heidecker and Eric Wareheim.

Murphy was listed as a producer for Yeah Yeah Yeahs' 2013 album, Mosquito. He also wrote the musical scores for the Noah Baumbach films Greenberg and While We're Young.

 Four Horsemen 
Murphy opened a wine bar named Four Horsemen in June 2015 in Williamsburg, Brooklyn, selling a range of natural red, white and orange wines.

Discography

 With LCD Soundsystem 

 LCD Soundsystem (2005)
 Sound of Silver (2007)
 This Is Happening (2010)
 American Dream (2017)

 With Falling Man 
 A Christening (1988)

 With Pony 
 Cosmovalidator (1994)

 With Speedking 
 The Fist and the Laurels (2002)

 Solo 
 "DoYaThing" (with Gorillaz and André 3000) (2012)
 Remixes Made with Tennis Data (2014)

 Personal life 
Murphy is married to a Danish-born wife, Christina Topsoe.

References

 External links 

 
 In-depth radio interview with James Murphy on Fresh Air'' (38 mins; 2010)

1970 births
Living people
American DJs
Record producers from New Jersey
Songwriters from New Jersey
Remixers
LCD Soundsystem members
Singers from New Jersey
People from West Windsor, New Jersey
West Windsor-Plainsboro High School South alumni
Grammy Award winners
21st-century American singers
21st-century American male singers
American post-punk musicians
American male songwriters